Ilan Goldfajn (born 12 March 1966) is an Israeli-born Brazilian economist, former governor of the Central Bank of Brazil and former director of the International Monetary Fund's Western Hemisphere Department. In December 2022, he became president of the Inter-American Development Bank.

Biography
Goldfajn was born in Haifa, Israel. He graduated in economics from the Federal University of Rio de Janeiro, received a master's degree from the Pontifical Catholic University of Rio de Janeiro and a doctorate from MIT where he completed his dissertation under the advisory of Stanley Fischer and Rudi Dornbusch.

He was appointed to the position of governor of the Central Bank of Brazil by Minister of Finance Henrique Meirelles on May 12, 2016. He oversaw the implementation of significant regulatory changes that opened the door to new players in the financial services industry, spurred innovation and digitalization, and fostered the growth of fintech companies, all of which bolstered Brazil’s financial sector.

Goldfajn was chosen central banker of the year by The Banker magazine in 2017, and best central banker by Global Finance magazine in 2018.

On September 13, 2021, he was appointed Director of the IMF's Western Hemisphere Department by Director-General Kristalina Georgieva, to assume office on January 3, 2022. He helped countries implement IMF-supported programs to address an array of challenges and also contributed to shaping the region’s policy dialogue on climate change, which led to the IMF’s first Resilience and Sustainability Facility.  

On November 20, 2022, he was elected president of the Inter-American Development Bank, assuming office on December 19 of the same year.

Goldfajn's private-sector experience includes key positions at three of Brazil’s leading financial institutions: chief economist and partner at Itaú Unibanco, founding partner at Ciano Investimentos, and partner and economist at Gávea Investimentos. He also served as chairman of Credit Suisse Brazil’s Advisory Board. 

Goldfajn has also held several consultant roles at top international finance and governance institutions, including the World Bank, the United Nations and the IMF.

He has taught economics at various universities in Brazil and the United States, has been an editor of several publications and has published numerous articles and books.

Goldfajn speaks English, Portuguese, Spanish and Hebrew.

Bibliography

References

|-

1966 births
Brazilian economists
Brazilian Jews
Federal University of Rio de Janeiro alumni
Living people
Massachusetts Institute of Technology alumni
People from Haifa
Pontifical Catholic University of Rio de Janeiro alumni
Presidents of the Central Bank of Brazil
Presidents of the Inter-American Development Bank